Michelle Schneider may refer to:

 Michelle Englot (born 1964),  Canadian curler from Regina, Saskatchewan
 Michelle G. Schneider (born 1954), former Republican member of the Ohio House of Representatives